The 2016 Latin American Series was the fourth edition of the Latin American Series, a baseball sporting event played by the champions of the professional winter leagues that make up the Latin American Professional Baseball Association (ALBP).

The competition took place at Estadio Stanley Cayasso in Managua, Nicaragua from January 26 to January 31, 2016.

Participating teams

Group Phase 

NOTE: Because first and second place were tied, Gigantes de Rivas qualified for the final as the representative of the host nation.

|}

Playoff Phase

Pre-playoff (Game 7) 

Boxscore

Pre-playoff (Game 8) 

Boxscore

Final

Statistics leaders

Team of the tournament

References

External links 
 Official Site

Latin American Series
2016 in baseball
International baseball competitions hosted by Nicaragua
Latin American Series
Latin American Series
Sport in Managua